The Association of International Physicians and Surgeons of Ontario (A.I.P.S.O.) is a non-profit, independent professional association which represents physicians and surgeons trained and licensed in jurisdictions outside Canada. AIPSO's mission is to ensure that internationally trained physicians are integrated effectively and equitably into the Canadian health care system.

The work of A.I.P.S.O. has included: providing information to members research related to access for international physicians and surgeons network and coalition building; and participating with regulatory and government bodies in the consultative reform of the processes of integration. The current AIPSO president is Dr. Peter Marosan. The current AIPSO educational program director at St. Michael's Hospital is Dr. Yiming Wang.

Founded in 1998 with 70 members, A.I.P.S.O. and its local affiliates have more than 2000 registered physicians from 105 countries. AIPSO's members are at various stages of the licensing process in Ontario. Most are not yet licensed to practice medicine in Ontario.

Objectives
 To facilitate access to the licensing process for internationally trained physicians 
 To work collaboratively with other stakeholders to identify and develop appropriate assessment, orientation, upgrading and integration programs for internationally trained physicians 
 To provide information to members on licensing and meaningful employment in the healthcare field

Mission
AIPSO's mission is to ensure that internationally trained physicians are integrated effectively and equitably into
the Canadian health care system. Founded in 1998 with 70 members, AIPSO and its local affiliates have more than 2000 registered physicians from 105 countries. AIPSO's members are at various stages of the licensing process in Ontario.

Advocacy
 A.I.P.S.O. is the principal advocate for IMGs (International Medical Graduate) in Ontario, representing your voice to the Ministry of Health, the College of Physicians and Surgeons of Ontario, CEPHEA, Health Force Ontario and other stakeholders and decision-makers.
 Your voice will become a part of the larger advocacy voice of IMGs seeking access to the system in Ontario.
 You will be consulted to help AIPSO develop policy positions and recommendations on issues affecting IMGs.
 You will be included in AIPSO statistics that inform the Ministry of Health as to how many IMGs are in Ontario, their specialties, experience etc.
 As an IMG member, you can vote in AIPSO elections to elect your representatives on the board of directors, and can run to sit on the board.

Presidents
 Dr. A. Razzaq, M.D. (1998-2000)
 Dr. Uday Shankardas, M.D., M.R.C.P. (2000-2005)
 Dr. Hector Fernandez, M.D. (2005-2006)
 Dr. Joshua Thambiraj, M.D., F.R.C.S. (2006-2010)
 Dr. Amin Lakhani, M.D. (2010-2017)
 Dr. Peter Marosan, M.D. (2017-)

References and external links
 http://www.aipso.webs.com
 http://www.aipso.ca/pages/about/
 http://www.aipso.ca/pages/membership/
 http://www.aipso.ca/pages/path/
 http://www.aipso.ca/pages/docs/romanow%20submission%20final%20version.htm
 https://web.archive.org/web/20090331063658/http://www.img-canada.ca/en/provinces/ontario/img-support-groups.html (contacting A.I.P.S.O.)

Health charities in Canada
Non-profit organizations based in Ontario